The Aurore MB 02-2 Mini Bulle is a French ultralight aircraft, designed by Michel Barry and produced by Aurore Sarl of Sauvagnon. The aircraft is supplied as a kit or as plans for amateur construction.

Design and development
The Mini Bulle was designed to comply with the Fédération Aéronautique Internationale microlight rules and is an evolution of the Aurore MB 02 Souricette with a more modern look as opposed to the MB 02's antique 1920s appearance. The Mini Bulle features a strut-braced shoulder-wing, a single-seat enclosed cockpit under a bubble canopy, fixed conventional landing gear and a single engine in tractor configuration.

The aircraft is made from wood with its flying surfaces covered in doped aircraft fabric. Its  span wing employs single supporting struts. The standard recommended engine is the  Hirth F23 two-stroke powerplant or the JPX 505. Differences with the earlier MB 02 include longer main landing gear legs to allow more propeller clearance and an aerodynamic cowling.

In 2015 the aircraft kit was €6,000 and plans sold for €230.

Specifications (MB 02-2 Mini Bulle)

References

External links

MB 02-2 Mini Bulle
1990s French ultralight aircraft
Homebuilt aircraft
Single-engined tractor aircraft